Ellen Schwanneke (1906–1972) was a German dancer and stage and film actress.

She was the daughter of stage and film actor Viktor Schwanneke.

Selected filmography
 Mädchen in Uniform (1931)
 Impossible Love (1932)
 A Mad Idea (1932)
 The Royal Waltz (1935)
 Not a Word About Love (1937)
 Everything Will Be Better in the Morning (1948)

References

Bibliography
 Waldman, Harry. Nazi Films in America, 1933-1942. McFarland, 2008.

External links

1906 births
1972 deaths
German female dancers
German film actresses
German stage actresses
Actresses from Berlin